South Carolina Highway 161 (SC 161) is a  primary state highway in the U.S. state of South Carolina. It connects the cities of Rock Hill, York, and Kings Mountain, North Carolina.

Route description

SC 161 is a multi-lane highway, traversing from U.S. Route 21 (US 21) and Interstate 77 (I-77), through the northern part of Rock Hill and north around York, to the back entrance area of Kings Mountain State Park and Kings Mountain National Military Park, and ends at the North Carolina state line.

History

The first SC 161 appeared in 1923 as a new primary routing from SC 16 in Eau Claire to SC 22. It was extended northwest by 1926 to SC 7 in Leeds. In 1928, the entire route was renumbered as part of SC 215.

The current SC 161 was established in 1930 as a new primary route, it originally traversed from SC 16 (today US 321) to the North Carolina state line, continuing as North Carolina Highway 215 (renumbered in 1937 to NC 161). In 1959, SC 161 was extended south, through York, to its current southern terminus at US 21 in Rock Hill. In 1986 or 1987, SC 161 was placed on bypass north around York, in concurrency with SC 5.

Junction list

York business loop

South Carolina Highway 161 Business (SC 161 Bus.) is a  business route in the southeastern and central portions of York, in the central portion of York County. It follows the old alignment of SC 161 through downtown York, via Liberty Street.

The business loop begins at an intersection with SC 5 and SC 161 in the southeastern part of the city. This intersection is also the southern terminus of SC 5 Bus., which begins concurrent with SC 161. They travel to the southeast and pass the York Comprehensive High School. After a brief portion outside the city limits, they curve to the east-northeast. After an intersection with the western terminus of SC 324 (McFarland Road), they curve to the northwest and then enter the main part of the city. Just after they pass the York Public Library, they intersect Roosevelt Street, which leads to the chamber of commerce. One block later, they meet U.S. Route 321 Business (US 321 Bus.) and SC 49 (Congress Street). A short distance later, they meet US 321, where SC 161 Bus. splits off to the north-northeast. The two highways travel through rural areas of the city until they intersect the northern terminus of US 321 Bus. (Kings Mountain Street). Here, US 321 and SC 161 Bus. curve to the north-northwest. Then they intersect SC 5 and SC 161. Here, SC 161 Bus. ends.

See also

References

External links

SC 161 at Virginia Highways' South Carolina Highways Annex
SC 161 Business at Virginia Highways' South Carolina Highways Annex

161
Transportation in York County, South Carolina